Mine Çetinkaya-Rundel is a Turkish-American statistician. She is a senior lecturer at University of Edinburgh, an associate professor of the practice at Duke University, and a professional educator at RStudio. She is the author of three open source statistics textbooks and is an instructor for Coursera. She is the chair-elect of the Statistical Education Section of the American Statistical Association.

Life
Çetinkaya-Rundel grew up in Turkey and graduated from Robert College,  before coming to the United States for her undergraduate studies to study actuarial science at New York University. After working as an actuary at Buck Consultants, Çetinkaya-Rundel enrolled in graduate school at the University of California, Los Angeles. She earned her master's degree and PhD in statistics at UCLA. Her dissertation, Estimating the impact of air pollution using small area estimation, was completed under the supervision of Jan de Leeuw.

Work
Çetinkaya-Rundel coauthored three open-access textbooks, OpenIntro Statistics, Introductory Statistics with Randomization and Simulation, and OpenIntro: Advanced High School Statistics. She is an author on the associated R package, openintro. Çetinkaya-Rundel is also a proponent of reproducible analysis in the context of statistics education.

Recognition
Çetinkaya-Rundel was elected as a Fellow of the American Statistical Association in 2020. She was elected chair of the ASA Statistical Computing program in 2021.

Selected publications

See also
OpenIntro Statistics

References

Year of birth missing (living people)
Living people
American people of Turkish descent
New York University alumni
University of California, Los Angeles alumni
American women statisticians
Data scientists
Turkish statisticians
Duke University faculty
Fellows of the American Statistical Association
R (programming language) people